Turdera is a small district (localidad) of Lomas de Zamora Partido in Buenos Aires Province, Argentina. It forms part of the urban conurbation of Greater Buenos Aires.

External links

Populated places in Buenos Aires Province
Populated places established in 1910
Lomas de Zamora Partido